Leville is a community in the Canadian province of Nova Scotia, located in the Chester Municipal District .

References
 Leville on Destination Nova Scotia

Communities in Lunenburg County, Nova Scotia
General Service Areas in Nova Scotia